{{DISPLAYTITLE:C23H28O7}}
The molecular formula C23H28O7 (molar mass: 416.464 g/mol, exact mass: 416.1835 u) may refer to:

 Gomisin A
 Hexacyclinol

Molecular formulas